Kate Bridges is a Canadian writer of romance novels since 2002.

Biography

Personal life
Kate Bridges grew up in Ontario, Canada and later in the Alberta prairies. During early years she worked as a pediatric intensive-care nurse. She also studied architecture and design. Married, she lives in Toronto, Ontario.

Writing career
Kate Bridges is a USA Today bestselling author. Her books have won several publishing awards, including Best Western of the Year by Romantic Times magazine for The Surgeon (2003) and Best Hero of the Year for The Engagement (2004). Five of her books received RT magazine's Best Hero of the Month honor.

Bibliography

Single novels
The Doctor's Homecoming (2002)
Luke's Runaway Bride (2002)
The Midwife's Secret (2003)

Canadian Mounties
The Surgeon (2003)
The Engagement (2004)

===Reid Brothers''' Trilogy===The Proposition (2004)The Bachelor (2005)The Commander (2006)

Klondike Gold RushKlondike Doctor (2007)Klondike Wedding (2007)Klondike Fever (2008)

AlaskanWanted in Alaska (2009)Alaskan Renegade (2009)Alaska Bride on the Run (2010)

OmnibusEngagement / Proposition / Bachelor (2005)

Anthologies in collaborationFrontier Christmas (2003) (with Carolyn Davidson and Ana Leigh)A Season of the Heart (2005) (with Mary Burton and Jillian Hart)Western Weddings (2008) (with Jillian Hart and Charlene Sands)Mail-Order Marriages'' (2010) (with Carolyn Davidson and Jillian Hart)

References

Canadian women novelists
21st-century Canadian novelists
Canadian romantic fiction writers
Living people
Women romantic fiction writers
21st-century Canadian women writers
Year of birth missing (living people)